Pleuroceras may refer to:

Pleuroceras (ammonite), a genus of ammonites
Pleuroceras (fungus), a genus of fungi